LLC SCF Technoavia, or Scientific Commercial Firm Technoavia, is a Russian aircraft manufacturer. It was established in 1991 by Vyacheslav Kondratiev. The main production facility is located at the Smolensk Aviation Plant.

Products

 Intracom GM-17 Viper
 Technoavia SM92 Finist
 SM-92T 
 SMG-92
 SM-92P patrol military version of the aircraft 
 Technoavia SM-94 and SM-94-1, modifications of the Yak-18T
 SP-91 aerobatic aircraft
 SP-95 high performance aerobatic monoplane 
 SM-2000 single-engine, 4 passenger, light turboprop aircraft 
 SP-55M, a heavily modified Yak-55
 Technoavia Rysachok - a twin-engine aircraft under development

References

External links

 TRACE delivers Goodrich de-ice system for Technoavia SM-2000 light turboprop, November, 2001

Aircraft manufacturers of Russia
Manufacturing companies established in 1991
1991 establishments in Russia
Russian brands